Paulo César de Campos Velho, better known as Paulo César Pereio (born 19 October 1940), is a Brazilian actor.

Selected filmography
 The Brave Warrior (1968)
Iracema: Uma Transa Amazônica (1974)
 A Queda (1976)
 Lucio Flavio (1977)
 Tudo Bem (1978)
 Better Days Ahead (1989)
 Magnifica 70 (2015–2016)

Activism
Pereio is known for being an ardent atheist and communist who is heavily opposed to the statue of Christ the Redeemer, claiming that it violates Brazil's secular constitution and ruins the beauty of the mountain. Since the late 20th century he has been gathering signatures for its removal.

References

External links

Living people
Brazilian male television actors
1940 births
People from Alegrete
Brazilian atheists
Brazilian communists